Chudin (from чудо meaning miracle) is a Russian masculine surname, its feminine counterpart is Chudina. It may refer to
Aleksandra Chudina (1923–1990), Soviet athlete 
Ivan Chudin (born 1990), Russian football player
Sergei Chudin (born 1973), Russian football player

See also
Chudov (surname)

Russian-language surnames